Phygasia is a genus of flea beetles in the family Chrysomelidae. There are around 70 described species in Phygasia, found in the Palearctic, Indomalaya, and tropical Africa.

Species
These species belong to the genus Phygasia:

 Phygasia africana Chapuis, 1875
 Phygasia basalis Kimoto, 2000
 Phygasia carinipennis Chen & Wang, 1980
 Phygasia chengi Lee, 2012
 Phygasia cobosi Madar & Madar, 1965
 Phygasia cyanea Medvedev, 1995
 Phygasia diancangana Wang, 1992
 Phygasia diluta Chûjô, 1963
 Phygasia dorsata Balý, 1878
 Phygasia eschata Gressitt & Kimoto, 1963
 Phygasia foveolata Wang, 1992
 Phygasia fulvipennis (Balý, 1874)
 Phygasia gracilicornis Wang & Yang, 2008
 Phygasia heikertingeri Peyerimhoff, 1929
 Phygasia hookeri Balý, 1876
 Phygasia indochinensis Medvedev, 1995
 Phygasia marginata Medvedev, 1995
 Phygasia media Chen & Wang, 1980
 Phygasia minuta Medvedev, 2001
 Phygasia nigricollis Wang & Yang, 2008
 Phygasia ornata Balý, 1876
 Phygasia pallidipennis Chen & Wang, 1980
 Phygasia parva Wang & Yang, 2008
 Phygasia potanini Lopatin, 1995
 Phygasia pseudomedia Wang & Yang, 2008
 Phygasia pseudornata Wang & Yang, 2008
 Phygasia quadriplagiata (Swartz, 1808)
 Phygasia ruficollis Wang in Wang & Yu, 1993
 Phygasia silacea (Illiger, 1807)
 Phygasia simidorsata Ge, Wang, Li & Yang, 2008
 Phygasia sulphuripennis Jacoby, 1899
 Phygasia suturalis Ge, Wang, Li & Yang, 2008
 Phygasia taiwanensis Ge, Wang, & Yang, 2010
 Phygasia tricolora Medvedev, 1995
 Phygasia unicolor (Olivier, 1808)
 Phygasia yunnana Wang & Yang, 2008

References

External links

 

Alticini
Chrysomelidae genera
Taxa named by Joseph Sugar Baly